Kalbasi is an Iranian surname.

Notable people surnamed Kalbasi include the following:

 Narges Kalbasi Ashtari (1988- ),  founder of the Prishan Foundation
 Sheema Kalbasi (1972- ), born in Tehran, Iran. Author, poet, humanitarian.
 Bahman Kalbasi (1979- ), born in Isfahan, Iran. BBC Correspondent, Persian Service.
 Ayatollah Mohammad Ibrahim Kalbasi, born in Isfahan, Iran. Shi'ite master of Islamic jurisprudence and religious sciences